The DST-ICTP-IMU Ramanujan Prize for Young Mathematicians from Developing Countries is a mathematics prize awarded annually by the International Centre for Theoretical Physics in Italy. The prize is named after the Indian mathematician Srinivasa Ramanujan. It was founded in 2004, and was first awarded in 2005.

The prize is awarded to a researcher from a developing country less than 45 years of age who has conducted outstanding research in a developing country.  The prize is supported by the Ministry of Science and Technology (India) and Norwegian Academy of Science and Letters through the Abel Fund, with the cooperation of the International Mathematical Union.

List of winners

See also

 SASTRA Ramanujan Prize
 List of mathematics awards

References

External links
International Mathematical Union

Mathematics awards
Awards established in 2004
Srinivasa Ramanujan
International awards